Dolmen de Axeitos is a prehistoric megalithic dolmen just to the northwest of the village , in the parish of , in the municipality of Ribeira, on the Barbanza Peninsula in the estuary of the Ría de Arousa in the Province of A Coruña, Galicia, in northern Spain. It is dated to 3600-4000 BC. Because of its historical and archaeological value, on March 11, 1978 it became a registered Bien de Interés Cultural landmark.

Dolmens in Spain
Bien de Interés Cultural landmarks in the Province of A Coruña
4th-millennium BC architecture
Bronze Age sites in Europe
Buildings and structures in the Province of A Coruña
Archaeological sites in Galicia (Spain)